Giang or Giàng may refer to

Communes and villages in Vietnam
Cẩm Giàng, Bắc Kạn
Đức Giang
Hồng Giang (disambiguation)
Long Giang
Phình Giàng
Tam Giang (disambiguation)
Tam Giang Đông
Tam Giang Tây
Trường Giang (disambiguation)

Other places in Vietnam
An Giang Province
An Giang Airport
An Giang University
Hùng Vương An Giang F.C., a football club
Bắc Giang Province
Bắc Giang, the province capital 
Bắc Giang railway station
Bắc Giang River
Bình Giang District
Cẩm Giàng District
Châu Giang, a former district
Đông Giang District
Giang Thành District
Hà Giang Province
Hà Giang, the province capital 
List of fauna of Hà Giang
Hậu Giang Province
Kiên Giang Province
Kiến Giang, the province capital 
Kiến Giang River
Kiên Giang F.C., a football club
Lạng Giang District
Nam Giang District
Ninh Giang District
Tây Giang District
Tiền Giang Province
Tiền Giang F.C., a football club
Văn Giang District

Other
Giang (name)
An Giang Coffee, a coffee company in Vietnam
Battle of Lo Giang during the Vietnam War in February 1968

See also
Gyang, a given name and surname